Kpelle may refer to:
 Kpelle people
Kpelle language
Kpelle syllabary

Language and nationality disambiguation pages